Zhaparov or Japarov (Cyrillic: Жапаров) is a Kazakhstani masculine surname, its feminine counterpart is Zhaparova or Japarova. It may refer to

Marat Zhaparov (born 1985), Kazakhstani ski jumper
Radik Zhaparov (born 1984), Kazakhstani ski jumper, brother of Marat
Ruslan Zhaparov (born 1996), Kazakhstani taekwondo competitor 
Sadyr Japarov (born 1968), Kyrgyz politician

Kazakh-language surnames